Statistics of Latvian Higher League in the 1977 season.

Overview
It was contested by 13 teams, and Energija won the championship.

League standings

References
 RSSSF

Latvian SSR Higher League
Football 
Latvia